Bob Watt (1927–2010) was Canadian ice hockey player.

Robert or Bob Watt may also refer to:

 Robert Watt (bibliographer) (1774–1819), Scottish physician and bibliographer
 Robert Watt (miner) (1832–1907), Scottish–American miner
 Bob Watt (footballer) (1933–1984), Australian rules footballer
 Robert Watt (born 1945) is a former Canadian museum curator and officer of arms.
 Robert Watt (Irish civil servant), Secretary General of the Department of Health (Ireland)
 Robert Lee Watt (born 1948), first African American French hornist hired by a major symphony orchestra in the United States

See also
 Robert Watts (disambiguation)
 Robert Watson-Watt (1892–1973), Scottish pioneer of radio direction finding and radar technology